Damdinsürengiin Altangerel (1945–1998) was a Mongolian teacher and writer.  He lived in the Mongolian capital of Ulaanbaatar, and taught English at the Mongolian University of Science and Technology.

Altangerel was the author of several English-Mongolian dictionaries, and published a collection of Mongolian folktales translated into English. He was married with two sons. In 1998 he died of liver cancer.

Works 
 A Modern Mongolian-English Dictionary: Cyrillic, 1998, 

1945 births
1998 deaths
20th-century Mongolian writers
People from Ulaanbaatar